Jocky Wilson's Darts Challenge is a video game of darts, created after darts champion Jocky Wilson. The game was published by Zeppelin Games and was released in 1989 for the Atari 8-bit family, Commodore 64, ZX Spectrum Amstrad CPC and Amiga. Music for the game was composed by Adam Gilmore. Music for the Amiga version was composed by Stuart Taylor.

External links

1989 video games
Commodore 64 games
ZX Spectrum games
Atari 8-bit family games
Amstrad CPC games
Amiga games
Video games developed in the United Kingdom
Wilson
Wilson
Video games based on real people